Attila Buda (born 16 August 1964) is a Hungarian weightlifter. He competed in the men's middle heavyweight event at the 1988 Summer Olympics.

References

External links
 

1964 births
Living people
Hungarian male weightlifters
Olympic weightlifters of Hungary
Weightlifters at the 1988 Summer Olympics
Sportspeople from Borsod-Abaúj-Zemplén County